Evermannella is a genus of sabertooth fishes.

Species
There are currently five recognized species in this genus:
 Evermannella ahlstromi R. K. Johnson & Glodek, 1975
 Evermannella balbo (A. Risso, 1820) (Balbo sabretooth)
 Evermannella indica A. B. Brauer, 1906
 Evermannella megalops R. K. Johnson & Glodek, 1975
 Evermannella melanoderma A. E. Parr, 1928 (Indian sabertooth)

References

Evermannellidae
Taxa named by Carl H. Eigenmann
Marine fish genera